James Edward Gentile (born June 3, 1934), also nicknamed "Diamond Jim", is an American former professional baseball first baseman. He played in Major League Baseball (MLB) for the Brooklyn / Los Angeles Dodgers, Baltimore Orioles, Kansas City Athletics, Houston Astros, and Cleveland Indians between 1957 and 1966.

Early career 

Born in San Francisco, California, Gentile was a powerful, left-handed slugger listed at 6' 4", 215 lb. He was signed by the Brooklyn Dodgers as a high school pitcher in 1952. He played his first minor league season as a pitcher, earning a 2-6 win–loss record. The next year he was converted into a first baseman. He languished for eight years in the minors for a Dodgers team that already had All-Star Gil Hodges at first base and Norm Larker. He dominated the minors, leading two separate leagues in home runs.

On September 24, 1957, Gentile started at first base for the Dodgers at Brooklyn's famed Ebbets Field in the final game played there. He was replaced by Pee Wee Reese in the top of the fifth inning with Reese going to third base and Gil Hodges moving from third to first. The game's final batter, Pittsburgh's Dee Fondy, hit a ground ball to Don Zimmer at shortstop and Zimmer threw to Hodges at first base for the game's final out.

Baltimore 
Gentile was traded to Baltimore in 1960, where he was named to the 1960 All-Star Game his first full season. He enjoyed his best season in 1961, hitting career highs of .302 batting average, 46 home runs, 141 runs batted in (see below), 96 runs, 147 hits, 25 doubles, 96 walks, .423 on-base percentage, .646 slugging average and 1.069 OPS. He finished third in the MVP ballot (behind Mickey Mantle and Roger Maris). In addition, Gentile hit five grand slams — (including two straight in one game)  —  setting an American League record that stood until Don Mattingly belted six in 1987.

In a nine-season career, Gentile batted .260 (759-for-2922) with 179 home runs, 549 RBI, 434 runs, 113 doubles, six triples, and three stolen bases in 936 games.

Jim also managed the 2005 Mid-Missouri Mavericks of the Frontier League.

1961 RBI record keeping error

Gentile's 141 RBI in 1961 was second only to Roger Maris' 142 RBI, however, analysis by Retrosheet determined Maris was incorrectly credited with an RBI in a game on July 5, 1961. Maris reached base on an error by numerous accounts. Therefore, Gentile and Maris both had 141 RBI in 1961. Gentile's contract with the Orioles in 1961 called for a $5,000 bonus if he led the league in RBI. The Orioles made good on that deal 50 years later and presented Gentile with a check for $5,000 at a game in 2010.

Gentile now lives in Edmond, Oklahoma.

See also
 List of Major League Baseball annual runs batted in leaders

References

External links

1934 births
Living people
American expatriate baseball players in Japan
Baltimore Orioles players
Baseball players from San Francisco
Brooklyn Dodgers players
Cleveland Indians players
Fort Worth Cats players
Houston Astros players
Kansas City Athletics players
Kintetsu Buffaloes players
Los Angeles Dodgers players
Major League Baseball first basemen
Mobile Bears players
Montreal Royals players
Minor league baseball managers
Oklahoma City 89ers players
Pueblo Dodgers players
St. Paul Saints (AA) players
San Diego Padres (minor league) players
Santa Barbara Dodgers players
Spokane Indians players
Sportspeople from Edmond, Oklahoma
American expatriate baseball players in Colombia